The East Turkestan football team is a team from the Uyghur region of East Turkestan. Previously registered as Uyghur, it is a member of ConIFA.

History
On 19 October 2019, it played its first international game ever, that ended with a 8–2 against West Papua in The Hague.

On 14 December 2019, East Turkestan played a qualification match for the 2020 CONIFA World Cup against Tamil Eelam in Cergy, France, that ended with a 0–3 loss.

East Turkistan Football Association

The idea to create an East Turkistan Football Association began in 2014 before it was eventually established.

References

External links
East Turkestan Football Federation website

CONIFA member associations
Asian national and official selection-teams not affiliated to FIFA